Tebing Tinggi Island (also Rantau) is an island off the north east coast of Riau Province, Sumatra, Indonesia, located in the Strait of Malacca. It is located in the Meranti Islands Regency, and is directly east of Padang Island and directly south of Rangsang Island.  The area is 1597 km2.

The capital is Selat Panjang.  Other population centers include Bengkikit, Merbau, Mengkudu, Sungaitohor and Mayau around the coast, and Deremi in the interior.  The population of the island at the 2010 Census was 81,008.

References

Riau Archipelago
Populated places in Indonesia